Cherokee Creek Boys School is an American therapeutic boarding school for boys located at 198 Cooper Road, Westminster, South Carolina, United States. Cherokee Creek has been fully accredited by the Southern Association of Colleges and Schools (SACS) since 2005, and is licensed by the state of South Carolina. The school is also a member of the National Association of Therapeutic Schools and Programs (NATSAP).

History

Cherokee Creek Boys School was founded by Beth Black and Jackson Culotta, after Black enrolled her son in a therapeutic school where Culotta was employed.
The school is a place where struggling middle-school boys receive assistance from licensed therapists and qualified counselors to help them address specific physical, academic, emotional, and social skill needs for each student. Students that come to Cherokee Creek Boys School are typically challenged with one of the following: Attention Deficit Disorder (ADD/ADHD), Autism, Asperger's Syndrome, depression, anxiety, defiant behavior, under-developed social skills, or learning disabilities.

Description

The staff at Cherokee Creek Boys School employ four core areas within the program: Personal Enrichment (ex. league sports, guitar lessons, martial arts), Academics (ex. Individual Education Plans and special academic services), Therapetic Services (ex. individual and group therapy, group counseling, crisis intervention and family therapy), and Health/Recreation (ex. swimming, hiking, boating, horseback riding, and camping).

References

Schools in Oconee County, South Carolina
Therapeutic boarding schools in the United States